O'Tooles GAC (Irish: Cumann Uí Thuathail) is a Gaelic Athletic Association club based in Ayrfield, Dublin, Ireland, formed in 1901.

History

Early years

O'Tooles GAC was formed in 1901 at 100 Seville Place in the north inner city of Dublin from the Gaelic League branch. The Gaelic League branch held their inaugural meeting in February 1901. Francis Cahill was one of the founding members of the club and Brother J.A. O’Mahoney, who was superior of O'Connell School was elected as the first president.

On Thursday 8 October 1901, after Irish classes the clubs first hurling team was formed. The captain of the team was Edward Keegan with Thomas Keegan elected as secretary and John Taylor as treasurer. In 1905 the club won their first competition, captained by Tim O'Neill, they won the Saturday Junior Hurling League.

August 1902 brought about the formation of the football team, with the clubs first major success arriving in 1910 in the form of the minor league.

In 1910, the St. Laurence O'Toole Pipe Band was formed with Tom Clarke elected president and playwright Seán O'Casey elected secretary.

Easter Rising

On the morning of Monday 24 April 1916, around 1,200 members of the Irish Volunteers and Irish Citizen Army arrived at a number of locations in Dublin. Among them were over 70 members of the O'Tooles club including two executed leaders, Tom Clarke (3 May) and Seán Mac Diarmada (12 May). Others involved included Liam Ó Briain, future TD and a professor of languages. Frank Robbins, future President of the Dublin Council of Trade Unions and Tom Ennis who was later a Free State Army General.

Bloody Sunday
On 21 November 1920, Dublin and Tipperary played a football challenge match in Croke Park. As a result of a mass shooting by the British Forces 14 innocent people including one player (Michael Hogan from Tipperary), died. It is estimated that around 60 – 100 people were also injured. O'Tooles have a deep connection with the events of this day as they contributed 12 players to the Dublin team with 9 players starting.

Substitutes: Tom Carey, Joe Norris & Tom Fitzgerald

Football
An amalgamation of O'Tooles and another local club Emeralds brought the golden age of football to the Seville Place club. The 1916 Dublin Intermediate Football Championship which was played in 1917 due to the number of players interned after the 1916 Rising heralded the beginning of the club's most successful football teams.

From 1918 to 1931, O'Tooles won 10 Dublin Senior Football Championship titles and produced the county's first five-in-a-row club team. During this period the club also contributed the majority of players to All-Ireland Senior Football Championship winning Dublin teams, including producing All-Ireland winning captains in Paddy Carey and Paddy McDonnell.

Hurling
A Dublin Intermediate Hurling Championship was won 1956 and 1961 with a Dublin Junior Hurling Championship arriving in 1982. In 1969, O’Tooles made the breakthrough and won their first Dublin Senior Hurling Championship. Further success was achieved in 1977, 1984 and 1990.

During the 1990s, O'Tooles who three county titles in a row in 1995, 1996 and 1997 and reached the Leinster Senior Club Hurling Championship final in 1996.

In 2002, O’Tooles defeated north side rivals and defending champions Craobh Chiaráin after a replay on a score line of 1–13 to 2–7.

Present day
As of 2022, they currently compete in the Division 2 league and the Senior 3 championship in hurling.
In football they are in the Division 3 league and the Dublin Intermediate Football Championship.

Honours

Dublin Senior Championships
 Dublin Senior Hurling Championship: 
 Winners (8): 1969, 1977, 1984, 1990, 1995, 1996, 1997, 2002
 Runners-up (5): 1973, 1981, 1982, 1985, 2011
 Dublin Senior Football Championship: 
 Winners (11): 1918, 1919, 1920, 1922, 1923, 1924, 1925, 1926, 1928, 1931, 1946
 Runners-up (6): 1927, 1929, 1930, 1935, 1938, 1964

Dublin Senior Leagues
 Dublin Senior Hurling League:
Winners (3): 1969, 1985, 2006
 Dublin Senior Football League:  
Winners (9): 1918, 1919, 1920, 1921, 1922, 1923, 1924, 1925, 1929

Other Dublin Championship Wins
 Dublin Intermediate Hurling Championship: 
Winners (3): 1917, 1956, 1961
 Dublin Junior Hurling Championship: 
Winners (1): 1982
 Dublin Intermediate Football Championship:
Winners (1): 1916
 Dublin Junior Football Championship: 
Winners (2): 1922, 1945
 Dublin Under 21 Hurling Championship: 
Winners (3): 1974, 1981, 2004
 Dublin Minor A Football Championship: 
Winners (10): 1911, 1919, 1920, 1921, 1924, 1931, 1933, 1934, 1954, 1957
 Dublin Minor B Football Championship: 
Winners (1): 2012
 Dublin Minor E Football Championship: 
Winners (1): 2021
 Dublin Minor A Hurling Championship: 
Winners (5): 1911, 1920, 1953, 1975, 1993
 Dublin Féile na nGael Division 4: 
Winners (2): 2016, 2021
 Dublin Senior 4 Camogie Championship: 
Winners (1): 1996

Other Wins
 Boland Cup:
Winners: 1966, 1969
 Smithwicks Cup:
Winners: 1968, 1969

Notable players

Senior inter-county footballers
 Dublin
{|
|- style="vertical-align:top"
||

Paddy Carey, All-Ireland winning captain with Dublin
Paddy McDonnell, All-Ireland winning captain with Dublin
Johnny McDonnell, All-Ireland winner with Dublin
Joe Synnott, All-Ireland winner with Dublin
John Synnott, All-Ireland winner with Dublin
Peter Synnott, Leinster Senior Football Championship Winner
Jack O'Reilly, All-Ireland winner with Dublin
William Robbins, All-Ireland winner with Dublin
Joe Stynes, All-Ireland winner with Dublin. Played with Bohemian F.C. Uncle of Jim Stynes, AFL, the only non-Australian-born player to receive game's most prestigious individual honour, the Brownlow medal

 Kildare &  Dublin
{|
|- style="vertical-align:top"
||

Larry Stanley, All-Ireland winning captain with Kildare & All-Ireland winner with Dublin

 Meath &  Dublin

Notable members

Francis Cahill - Founding Member and Teachta Dála for Dublin North
Seán O'Casey - Irish Playwright
Liam Ó Briain - Irish Language Expert and Easter Rising Veteran
Tom Clarke - Signatory of the Proclamation of the Irish Republic
Seán Mac Diarmada - Signatory of the Proclamation of the Irish Republic
Larry Stanley - High jumper who represented Ireland at the 1924 Summer Olympics
Frank Robbins - President of the Dublin Council of Trade Unions
Tom Ennis - Captain of the first O'Tooles team to win the Dublin Senior Football Championship. Stationed at the D.B.C tower in O'Connell Street during the Easter Rising under the orders of James Connolly and Free State Army General
Edward Keegan - Founding member and first hurling captain. Stationed at the South Dublin Union during the Easter Rising
Michael O'Hanrahan - second in command of Dublin's 2nd battalion under Commandant Thomas MacDonagh during the Easter Rising
Con Clarke - Dublin County Board Chairman, O'Tooles Chairman and winner of Senior Hurling Championships as player and manager.
Jimmy Wren - Club Historian and Dublin Senior Hurling Championship winner in 1969

References

External links
O'Tooles' GAC Official Website
Official Dublin GAA Website

Gaelic games clubs in Dublin (city)
Hurling clubs in Dublin (city)
Gaelic football clubs in Dublin (city)
Camogie clubs in County Dublin